Khawaja or khwaja is an honorific title used across the Middle East, South Asia, Southeast Asia and Central Asia, particularly towards Sufi teachers. The word comes from the Iranian word khwāja (New Persian khāje خواجه) and translates as "master", "lord". 

Some of the Kashmiri converts to Islam by Sufi saints adopted the title Khawaja. Khawajas were considered rich and were mostly traders.

Notable people 
Khwaja Muhammad Azam Didamari
Hina Khawaja Bayat
Khawaja Muhammad Asif
Usman Khawaja
Khawaja Saad Rafique
Khawaja abdul rasheed 
Khawaja Mansoor Ahmed 
 Khawaja Muhammad Sabeeh
 Khawaja Muhammad Uns

References

Islamic honorifics
Sufism